Bogusław Pietrzak (born 21 May 1958) is a Polish football manager.

References

1958 births
Living people
Polish footballers
Association football midfielders
GKS Jastrzębie players
Zagłębie Sosnowiec players
Pogoń Szczecin players
SKN St. Pölten players
Raków Częstochowa players
Śląsk Wrocław players
RKS Radomsko players
Ekstraklasa players
I liga players
Polish expatriate footballers
Expatriate footballers in Austria
Polish expatriate sportspeople in Austria
Polish football managers
Ekstraklasa managers
I liga managers
II liga managers
ŁKS Łódź managers
Ruch Chorzów managers
Pogoń Szczecin managers
Piast Gliwice managers
Footballers from Łódź
Świt Nowy Dwór Mazowiecki managers